WOW Gospel Essentials 2 is a best of gospel music collection including some of the biggest hits of the modern era. The album has twelve songs on a single CD. It peaked at tenth place on Billboard's Top Gospel Albums chart in 2009, and at 74 on the Top R&B/Hip-Hop Albums chart.

Track listing

References 

2009 compilation albums
Gospel compilation albums